Efra, Evra or Afrah is a small mountainous village in Qudsaya District, Syria.  It is located 35 km from the city of Damascus and 10 km from Ain al-Fijah. Altitude is 1600 m. According to the Syria Central Bureau of Statistics, the village had a population of 1,029 in the 2004 census. Its inhabitants are predominantly Sunni Muslims.  Efra experiences cold winters and mild summers. Inhabitants work mainly in agriculture. They produces various fruits like figs, apples, and cherries. The village used to be an ancient Roman summer resort due to its weather.

References

Bibliography

 

Populated places in Qudsaya District